Rafat is a Palestinian town located in the Salfit Governorate of the State of Palestine, in the northern West Bank, 38 kilometers southwest of Nablus. According to the Palestinian Central Bureau of Statistics, it had a population of 1,861 in 2007.

Location
It is south of az-Zawiya, north east of Deir Ballut, north west of Kafr ad-Dik, and east of Kafr Qasem.

History
Sherds from the Iron Age II, Persian, Hellenistic/Roman, Byzantine, Crusader/Ayyubid and Mamluk eras have been found here.

A white mosaic pavements has been found here.

Ottoman era
In 1517, the village was included in the Ottoman empire with the rest of Palestine, and potsherds from the early Ottoman period have been found here. It appeared in the 1596 tax-records as 'Arafat, located in the Nahiya of Jabal Qubal of the Liwa of Nablus. The population was 6 households, all Muslim. In addition to sporadic income and a fixed tax for residents of the Nablus region, they paid a fixed tax rate of 33.3% on agricultural products like wheat, barley, summer crops, olive trees, goats, and beehives; a total of 3,100 akçe.

In 1838, it was noted as a Muslim village, in Jurat Merda, south of Nablus. Extensive ruins were also noted here.

In 1870 Guérin found a number of ancient cisterns, and a rectangular birket cut in the rock and measuring 15 paces long by 10 broad. He also speaks of 'several' tombs.

In 1882, the PEF's Survey of Western Palestine (SWP) described Rafat as "a semi-ruinous stone village on a ridge, apparently an ancient site, with a very conspicuous Mukam on a piece of rock west of the village, and rock-cut tombs. The water supply is from wells and cisterns." They further noted: "On the north-west of the village is a steep rocky descent, in which are two tombs of the kind called 'rock-sunk', one of which is cut in a square block of rock, the top of which is levelled."

British Mandate era
In the 1922 census of Palestine conducted by the British Mandate authorities, Rafat had a population of 92, all Muslim, increasing in the 1931 census to 127, still all Muslim, in a total of 31 houses. 

In the 1945 statistics the population of Rafat was 180, all Muslims, while the total land area was 8,125 dunams, according to an official land and population survey. Of this, 1,889 dunams were used for cereals, while 24 dunams were classified as built-up (urban) areas.

Jordanian era
In the wake of the 1948 Arab–Israeli War, and after the 1949 Armistice Agreements, Rafat came under Jordanian rule.

In 1961, the population was 375.

Post-1967
Since the Six-Day War in 1967, Rafat has been under Israeli occupation.

After the 1995 accords, 7.5% of the village land was classified as Area B, the remaining 92.5% as Area C. According to ARIJ, Israel has confiscated 101 dunams of land from Rafat and land from Zawiya for the Israeli quarry of "Mazor Atiqa". This quarry is now on the Israeli side of the separation wall, and Israel exports 94% of the materials extracted from it to Israel. This in a clear violation of the international law, which does not permit any civil occupation to exploit natural resources in occupied territories for their economic favour.

Notable people
 Yahya Ayyash

References

Bibliography

External links
 Welcome To Rafat
 Rafat, Welcome to Palestine
Survey of Western Palestine, Map 14:     IAA,  Wikimedia commons
  Rafat village (fact sheet), Applied Research Institute–Jerusalem, ARIJ
Rafat village profile, ARIJ
Rafat, aerial photo, ARIJ
Development Priorities and Needs in Rafat, ARIJ
 Four Demolition Orders in Rafat – Salfit Governorate, POICA

Towns in Salfit Governorate
Salfit Governorate
Municipalities of the State of Palestine